Making Love is an album by Atom and His Package, composed of B-sides, EP exclusives, and rarities originating from various artist compilations.

Track listing
 "(Lord It's Hard to Be Happy When You're Not) Using the Metric System" - 2:50
 "Nutrition" - 2:12 (The Dead Milkmen cover)
 "Hats Off to Halford" - 1:40
 "Pumping Iron For Enya" - 2:45
 "Bloody Lip" - 0:18 (I Hate You cover)
 "It's A Mad Mad Mad Mad Mad Mad Mad Mad Lib" - 1:59
 "Thresholds to Adult Living" - 2:47 (Fracture cover)
 "He Kissed Me (Rock Version)" - 1:47
 "Avenger (Rock Version)" - 2:41
 "Atom and His Package (Rock Version)" - 2:27
 "Head (She's Just A...) (Rock Version)" - 1:51
 "Head of Septa, Nose of Me" - 2:04
 "Karpathia" - 1:40
 "Son of Poop and George" - 0:45 (Sockeye cover)
 "Getaway Car" - 1:28
 "What WE Do On Christmas" - 2:30
 "P.P. (Doo-Doo)" - 3:12

References

1999 compilation albums
Adam Goren albums